The men's aerials competition of the FIS Freestyle Ski and Snowboarding World Championships 2017 was held at Sierra Nevada, Spain on March 9 (qualifying)  and March 10 (finals). 
27 athletes from 11 countries competed.

Qualification

The following are the results of the qualification.

Final
The following are the results of the finals.

References

Aerials, men's